KNSB may refer to:

 KNSB (FM), a radio station (91.1 FM) in Bettendorf, Iowa
  (Koninklijke Nederlandsche Schaatsenrijders Bond)
 The  (Dutch: Koninklijke Nederlandse Schaakbond - KNSB)
 The Confederation of Independent Trade Unions of Bulgaria, also known as KNSB